The Denham-Lacy House (also known as the Virginia C. Turnbull House) is a historic house located in Monticello, Florida.

Description and history 
It is one of three Italianate-style structures in Monticello. On May 6, 1982, it was added to the U.S. National Register of Historic Places. Restoration of the property was undertaken by its sixth successive owner, Patricia Hays Inmon, in 2000. The house currently operates as a six-room bed and breakfast Inn.

References

Houses on the National Register of Historic Places in Florida
National Register of Historic Places in Jefferson County, Florida
Houses in Jefferson County, Florida
Monticello, Florida
Bed and breakfasts in Florida
Italianate architecture in Florida